Expo/La Brea station is an elevated light rail station on the E Line of the Los Angeles Metro Rail system. The station is located over the intersection of Exposition Boulevard and La Brea Avenue, after which the station is named, in the West Adams neighborhood of Los Angeles.

The official name of the station changed to Expo/La Brea/Ethel Bradley on October 10, 2015, in honor of Ethel Bradley, the wife of former Los Angeles mayor Tom Bradley.

History 
Originally a stop on the Los Angeles and Independence and Pacific Electric railroads, it closed on September 30, 1953, with the closure of the Santa Monica Air Line and remained out of service until re-opening on Saturday, April 28, 2012. It was completely rebuilt for the opening of the Expo Line from little more than a station stop marker. Regular scheduled service resumed Monday, April 30, 2012.

Service

Station layout

Hours and frequency

Connections 
, the following connections are available:
 LADOT DASH: Crenshaw
 Los Angeles Metro Bus: ,

Notable places nearby 
The station is within walking distance of the following notable places:
 Michelle and Barack Obama Sports Complex

Station artwork 
The station's art was created by artist Jose Lozano.  Entitled LA Metro Lotería, the installation depicts scenes related to using LA's Metro system in the style of a Lotería card game.

References 

E Line (Los Angeles Metro) stations
Railway stations in Los Angeles
West Adams, Los Angeles
Railway stations in the United States opened in 2012
2012 establishments in California
Pacific Electric stations